Nadezhda Ilyina (née , Kolesnikova; 24 January 1949 —  7 December 2013) was a Russian athlete who competed mainly in the 400 metres.

Ilyina trained at Dynamo in Moscow. She competed for the Soviet Union in the 1976 Summer Olympics held in Montreal, Canada in the 4 x 400 metres where she won the bronze medal with her teammates Inta Kļimoviča, Lyudmila Aksyonova and Natalya Sokolova. She was the mother of Russian tennis star Nadia Petrova.

Ilyina died in a car accident in December 2013.

References

External links
Sports Reference

1949 births
2013 deaths
Sportspeople from Stavropol Krai
Russian female sprinters
Soviet female sprinters
Olympic athletes of the Soviet Union
Olympic bronze medalists for the Soviet Union
Olympic bronze medalists in athletics (track and field)
Athletes (track and field) at the 1972 Summer Olympics
Athletes (track and field) at the 1976 Summer Olympics
Medalists at the 1976 Summer Olympics
Universiade medalists in athletics (track and field)
European Athletics Championships medalists
World record setters in athletics (track and field)
Dynamo sports society athletes
Road incident deaths in Russia
Universiade gold medalists for the Soviet Union
Medalists at the 1973 Summer Universiade
Olympic female sprinters